Huang Qun may refer to:

Huang Qun (discus thrower), Chinese discus thrower
Huang Qun (gymnast), Chinese gymnast